Neil MacFarlane (born 10 October 1977, in Dunoon) is a Scottish former professional football player and coach, who is head coach of Brentford B. MacFarlane played as a defensive midfielder at a number of clubs at all four levels of the Scottish league system. After his retirement as a player in 2011, he became a coach and was appointed to his first managerial role at English non-League club Kidderminster Harriers in 2018.

Club career

Early years (1999–2002) 
A defensive midfielder, McFarlane began his senior career with Queen's Park in 1999 and won the Third Division title in his first season with the club. He moved to Scottish Premier League club Kilmarnock in July 2000, but failed to make a first team appearance and instead spent much of his single season at Rugby Park away on loan at former club Queen's Park and Clyde. MacFarlane transferred to First Division club Airdrieonians in July 2001 and though his 2001–02 season was ended prematurely by a cruciate ligament injury, he was a part of the team which was victorious in the 2001 Scottish Challenge Cup Final.

Heart of Midlothian (2002–2006) 
Though still recovering from a cruciate ligament injury suffered while an Airdrieonians player, MacFarlane signed a one-year contract with Scottish Premier League club Heart of Midlothian in July 2002, on a part-time wage. He broke into the team in November 2002 and progressed sufficiently to sign an improved contract in January 2003. MacFarlane signed a new two-year contract at the end of the 2004–05 season and was a regular member of the team through to the early months of the 2005–06 season, when he fell out of favour under manager George Burley. A move to Dundee United was blocked by the Hearts board in August 2005 and after suffering a knee injury, he made just one appearance under Burley's successor, Graham Rix, before departing the club in January 2006. MacFarlane made 95 appearances and scored one goal during his three-and-a-half years at Tynecastle.

Later career (2006–2011) 
MacFarlane spent the second half of the 2005–06 season with Scottish Premier League club Aberdeen, before signing a two-year contract with First Division club Gretna in May 2006. Injuries restricted him to just eight appearances during the 2006–07 season, but he still received a First Division winners' medal. After his Gretna contract was terminated in May 2007, MacFarlane moved to First Division club Queen of the South on a two-year contract. He had two seasons as a mainstay of the Queens team, reaching the 2008 Scottish Cup Final and qualifying for the UEFA Cup, in which he had previously competed while a Hearts player. MacFarlane wound down his career with spells at lower division clubs Greenock Morton, Airdrie United and Annan Athletic and retired in 2011.

Coaching career 
MacFarlane began his coaching career in 2012 and served as assistant to former Heart of Midlothian teammate Steven Pressley at Falkirk, Coventry City, Fleetwood Town and Pafos. In February and March 2015, he briefly held the role of caretaker manager at Coventry City, before leaving the club at the end of the 2014–15 season. MacFarlane joined Milton Keynes Dons as first team coach to manager Robbie Neilson in December 2016 and stayed in the role until Neilson's sacking in January 2018.

Managerial career

Kidderminster Harriers 
On 25 May 2018, MacFarlane was announced as manager of National League North club Kidderminster Harriers. He had briefly coached at the club in 2015. Tasked with promotion, MacFarlane presided over 27 matches, winning 12, before he agreed to part ways with the club in January 2019.

Brentford B 
On 30 May 2019, MacFarlane joined Brentford as head coach of the Championship club's B team. As a result of first team head coach Thomas Frank testing positive for COVID-19, MacFarlane presided over the first team's 2–1 FA Cup third round victory over Middlesbrough on 9 January 2021.

Career statistics

Managerial statistics

Honours

Queen's Park
Scottish League Third Division: 1999–00

Airdrieonians
Scottish Challenge Cup: 2001–02

Gretna

 Scottish League First Division: 2006–07

References

External links

 (Morton)

Neil McFarlane at brentfordfc.com

1977 births
Living people
People from Dunoon
Scottish footballers
Airdrieonians F.C. (1878) players
Kilmarnock F.C. players
Clyde F.C. players
Heart of Midlothian F.C. players
Queen's Park F.C. players
Aberdeen F.C. players
Greenock Morton F.C. players
Gretna F.C. players
Queen of the South F.C. players
Scottish Premier League players
Scottish Football League players
Association football midfielders
Greenock Morton F.C. non-playing staff
Airdrieonians F.C. players
Annan Athletic F.C. players
Coventry City F.C. non-playing staff
Fleetwood Town F.C. non-playing staff
Milton Keynes Dons F.C. non-playing staff
Falkirk F.C. non-playing staff
National League (English football) managers
Scottish expatriates in Cyprus
Kidderminster Harriers F.C. managers
Coventry City F.C. managers
Scottish football managers
Sportspeople from Argyll and Bute
Brentford F.C. non-playing staff
English Football League managers
Association football coaches